Canny Bit Verse is a book, written and published by poet Robert Allen  from Northumberland, England, in 1994. It contains a variety of poems, which between them praise the valley of the North Tyne, talk about local village cricket, or tell of sad occurrences as in the "whee's deid" (obituary) column, and according to the sales details "and for those who don't know their cushat (wood pigeon) from their shavie (chaffinch), there's a glossary of dialect words".

The poems were written at an earlier date and had been recorded by  Allen on to three audio tapes, which he had produced; these are The Canniest Place on Eorth, Ridin' High and The Lang Pack.

The 128 page book is illustrated by local writer and artist Henry Brewis.

The Northumbrian Language Society, of which Allen was a founder member, is the sole supplier of this and others of his books and recordings.

Contents
The contents cover many topics, mainly written in Northumbrian Dialect, often very broad.

Below is a list of a few of the contents of the book:

Poems 
Bonnie North Tyne    
A Canny Welcome
A Cautionary Tale
The Corbie Crow
The Costly chimney cowl
End O' Lambin Day
The Grittor
A Lot Of It Aboot
The Owld Farmor's Advice
The Owld Men's Thowts
Spuggies
The Whee's Deed Collum

Prose 
God’s Bairn A Northumbrian version of the Christmas story

References

External links
 The Northumbrian Language Society

Northumbrian folklore
1994 poetry books
English poetry collections